Aidoo is a surname. Notable people with the surname include:

Ama Ata Aidoo (born 1942), Ghanaian writer
Fiifi Aidoo (born 1996), Ghanaian-Finnish basketball player
Joseph Aidoo (politician) (born 1957), Ghanaian politician
Joseph Aidoo (Ghanaian footballer) (born 1995), Ghanaian football (soccer) player
Kofi Aidoo (born 195?), Ghanaian writer
Kojo Aidoo (born 1978), Canadian footballer
Lawrence Aidoo (born 1982), Ghanaian football (soccer) player
Paul Evans Aidoo (born 1958), Ghanaian politician